Left Right Sir is a 2004 Sri Lankan Sinhala comedy action film directed by Bandu Samarasinghe and produced by National Film Corporation. It stars Bandu Samarasinghe and Nilanthi Dias in lead roles along with Neil Alles, and Vijaya Nandasiri. Music composed by Sarath de Alwis. It is the 1035th Sri Lankan film in the Sinhala cinema.

Plot

Cast
 Bandu Samarasinghe as Sudha
 Nilanthi Dias as Madhu
 Neil Alles as Saradiel 'Mudalali'
 Vijaya Nandasiri as Pinto
 Sanoja Bibile as Mary
 Susil Perera as Piyasoma
 Sando Harris as Ronnie
 Susila Kottage as Madhulawathi
 Tyrone Michael as Siripala
 Rahal Bulathsinhala as Steven Cooray 
 Teddy Vidyalankara as Jimmy
 Arjuna Kamalanath

Soundtrack

References

2004 films
2000s Sinhala-language films
2000s action comedy films
Sri Lankan comedy films
2004 comedy films